Leon and the Forklifts is an American band playing in and around Western New York from 1998–present, best known for hits like "American Music" (2000), "BlueBird Street" (1999) and "New Jazz Fool" (2001).

Band members
 Mike Bongiovanni – Lead vocals
 Matt Schneider – Lead guitar
 Jeff Cooke – Bass
 Jeff Schaller – Percussion/drums
 Justin Lackie – Saxophone

Rotating / previous members include:
 Wild' Bill Wachowiak – Percussion/drums
 Fritz the Kat – Harmonica
 Jason 'Jay' Ditley – Bass
 Eric Murray – Bass
 Joshua Hill; Guest Keyboardist

Discography
 Leon in the Basement: Album release – 1998
 Where's Leon?: Album release – 2001

History
The group, initially located in Buffalo, New York, started as a four piece Blues band led by vocalist Mike Bongiovanni with Matt Schneider, Bill Wachowiak and Fritz The Kat.  Fritz the Kat was currently playing with another Buffalo band named Schwannoma, when approached by Mike Bongiovanni to possibly put together the band and play some local gigs.

Leon and the Forklifts made their first appearance on October 23, 1998 at a local coffee shop on Main Street in Buffalo, New York on open mic night.  The band was approached by a booking agent for Nietzsche's, Buffalo's Music Hotspot, on Allen Street.

The band began to make a name for itself, so the articles were written, "Always fair dressed in suits,' "lovin the ironing board keyboard stand," "the spinning bass, jumpin from amp to amp..." - The Buffalo News - The Gusto, Artvoice Magazine.

Leon and The Forklifts became the regular booked house band for McGarrett's (formerly Heenans's - Elmwood Avenue and Bidwell) (2001), The Calumet and Big Shotz (Chippewa Street) (2003).

Leon and The Forklifts shares the stage with a great number of local and national acts - including, Michael Cisvca, Freddy "King" Cole, The Mighty Mighty Bosstones, Rhubarb, Bob Weir, The Outer Circle Orchestra, The Benny Goodman Orchestra (Mayor's Ball, 2003) and Ron Hawkins and the Rusty Nails - Thursday at the Square (6/10/99).

Leon and the Forklifts opened up for The Mighty Blue Kings in Buffalo, New York in 1999. Toni Ruberto of the Buffalo News wrote, "Leon and the Forklifts faced an exciting and challenging role as the opening act for the Mighty Blue Kings, one of the hottest acts on the swing circuit, and did more than hold their own last week."

Resurgence
In February 2009, the original members of the band came to a decision to start practicing again and return to the Buffalo music scene.  Picking up right where they left off, Leon and the Forklifts began booking shows around Western New York including top local venues at Pearl Street Grill & Brewery, Sonoma Grille and The Lafayette Tap Room.

On Sunday, August 16, 2009, Leon and the Forklifts was a featured act at Carly's Crossing, showing their support for pediatric cancer research and patient care at Roswell Park Comprehensive Cancer Center.

With a consistent dedication to the Buffalo Music Scene, Leon and the Forklifts continues to entertain in and around Western New York.

References

External links
 Leon and the Forklifts official website
 Leon and the Forklifts official FaceBook page

American blues musical groups